Plastic Fang is the seventh official release by the American punk blues group The Jon Spencer Blues Explosion, released on Matador in 2002. "She Said" was released as a single and a music video was filmed for it. In the video, Jon Spencer is a vampire being hunted by nuns whom he eventually seduces into a striptease en masse, before fighting and dying at the hands of a vampiress.

This album features guest appearances by Dr. John, Bernie Worrell and Willie Weeks and design by Chip Kidd. There are several different versions of this release, and some of them had a DVD included with the album, called Fang Visual, the most complete of which is the Australian release.

Track listing

US release
"Sweet n Sour" - 3:15
"She Said" - 4:17
"Money Rock'n'Roll" - 3:01
"Killer Wolf" - 4:34
"The Midnight Creep" - 3:47
"Hold On" - 4:54
"Down in the Beast" - 4:26
"Shakin' Rock'n'Roll Tonight" - 2:52
"Over and Over" - 3:50
"Mother Nature" - 4:30
"Mean Heart" - 4:26
"Point of View" - 4:28

AU release
CD1:
"Sweet n Sour"
"She Said"
"Money Rock'n'Roll"
"Killer Wolf"
"Tore Up & Broke"
"Hold On"
"Down in the Beast"
"Shakin' Rock'n'Roll Tonight"
"The Midnight Creep"
"Over And Over"
"Mother Nature"
"Mean Heart"

CD2:
"Point of View"
"Do Ya Wanna Get It?"
"Maureen"
"Alex"
"Over And Over" (Techno Animal Mix)
"Money Rock'n'Roll" (Sub Species Mix)
"Over And Over" (Barry Adamson Mix)
VIDEOS:
"She Said" (Directors Cut)
"She Said" (Live at 100 Club)
"Sweet & Sour"
"Point of View" (Live at Brixton)
"Shakin' Rock'n'Roll Tonight" (Live at Brixton)

JP release
"Sweet N Sour"
"She Said"
"Money Rock 'N' Roll"
"Ghetto Mom"
"Alex"
"Hold On"
"Over And Over"
"Then Again I Will"
"Down In The Beast"
"Shakin' Rock 'N' Roll Tonight"
"The Midnight Creep"
"Like A Bat"
"Killer Wolf"
"Mean Heart"

Fang Visual

"She Said" (Video - Sigismondi)
"Sweet n Sour" (Video)
a. "Calvin" (Live) / b. "Mean Heart" (Live) / c. "Sweet n Sour" (Live)
a. "2Kindsa Love" (Live) / b. "Flavor" (Live) / c. "Attack" (Live)
TV Appearance (InfoPlus)
a. "Point of View" (Live) / b. Down in the Beast (Live)
Jon Spencer Interview
Studio Footage, NYC
"Bellbottoms" (Live)
"She Said" (Video - 100 Club)
"Talk About The Blues" (Live)

References

External links
 MP3 Track Downloads at Amazon

2002 albums
Jon Spencer Blues Explosion albums
Matador Records albums